"You Wanna Give Me a Lift" is a song co-written by American country music artist Loretta Lynn and her sister Peggy Sue Wells. It was originally recorded and made popular by Loretta Lynn. It was released as a single in May 1970 via Decca Records.

Background and reception 
"You Wanna Give Me a Lift" was recorded at the Bradley's Barn on October 1, 1969. Located in Mount Juliet, Tennessee, the session was produced by renowned country music producer Owen Bradley. Two additional tracks were recorded during this session including Lynn's signature hit song "Coal Miner's Daughter".

"You Wanna Give Me a Lift" reached number six on the Billboard Hot Country Singles survey in 1970. The song became her eighteenth top ten single on the country chart. Additionally, the song peaked at number four on the Canadian RPM Country Songs chart during this same period. It was included on her studio album, Loretta Lynn Writes 'Em & Sings 'Em (1970).

Track listings 
7" vinyl single
 "You Wanna Give Me a Lift"
 "What's the Bottle Done with My Baby"

Charts

Weekly charts

References 

1970 songs
1970 singles
Decca Records singles
Loretta Lynn songs
Songs written by Loretta Lynn
Song recordings produced by Owen Bradley